was a railway line operated by Japanese National Railways that connected Sasayamaguchi Station with Fukusumi Station in present-day  Tamba-Sasayama, Hyōgo, Japan. The line was discontinued on 1 March 1972.

Data 
The single-track 1,067-mm gauge railway was operated between Sasayamaguchi and Fukusumi (17.6 km)
with six stations including both termini. 
The line was not electrified.

History 

During World War II, the railway line was constructed for transport of manganese and quartz sand, as a part of plan to connect Sasayamaguchi Station with Sonobe Station as bypass of Sanyo Main Line. In 1944, the line was open to traffic in the section between Sasayamaguchi Station and Fukusumi Station. At the same time, the Sasayama Railway which opened in 1913 was discontinued. In 1945, the end of the war led to the discontinuation of the construction of the remainder of the planned line to Sonobe Station.

After that, despite contribution to locals, ridership was low and in 1968, the line was listed as one of 83 unprofitable lines for consideration of closure.
Consequently on 1 March 1972, the line was closed.

Besides, the  bus route has been operated between Sasayamaguchi Station and Sonobe Station by Japanese Government Railways and Japanese National Railways since 1934. This line was inherited to West JR Bus, but JR withdrew from the operation in 2002. The line was substituted by  Shinki Bus that runs between Sasayamaguchi Station and Fukusumi Station, and Keihan Kyoto Kotsu that runs between Fukusumi Station and Sonobe Station.

Stations

References

External links 

Tamba-Sasayama Internet TV

Railway lines opened in 1944
Railway lines closed in 1972
Railway lines in Japan
Rail transport in Hyōgo Prefecture